Osteocephalus oophagus is a species of frogs in the family Hylidae found in Brazil, Colombia, French Guiana, Guyana, and possibly Suriname. Its natural habitat is subtropical or tropical moist lowland forests. It is also reported to produce bufotenin.

Females return to the egg deposition sites at intervals of about five days and, usually in amplexus with the same male, and produce eggs that serve as food for the tadpoles, hence the specific name meaning "egg eater".

Sources

Osteocephalus
Amphibians of Brazil
Amphibians of Colombia
Amphibians of Guyana
Amphibians described in 1995
Taxonomy articles created by Polbot